Jennifer Black is an American author of paranormal romance novels, urban fantasy, and young adult fantasy novels. She began writing under the pen name Jenna Black in 2006. She published one novel earlier under her other name, Jennifer Barlow, and at least two short stories before that under her birth name. Jenna Glass is yet another pen name.

Biography
Jenna Black was raised in Bratt, Florida. She got her BA in physical anthropology and French from Duke University and has remained in the Research Triangle area in the years since. She once aspired to be a primatologist, but ended up writing technical documentation. She attended the Clarion West Writers Workshop in 1989. Her first mass market paperback, Watchers in the Night (Tor Paranormal Romance), came out in 2006.

Black is represented by the Irene Goodman Literary Agency and is a member of the online writing blog, Deadline Dames.

Bibliography

As Jennifer Barlow 

 Hamlet Dreams (2001)

As Jenna Black

Free reads 
 Embraced in Darkness (2005–06) (can be downloaded for free from her website )
 The Matchmaker’s Curse (can be downloaded for free if you become a member of her Free Reads Yahoo group)
Remedial Magic (can be downloaded for free from her website)

Replica
 Replica (2013)
 Resistance (2014)
 Revolution (2014)

Guardians of the Night
 Watchers in the Night (2006)
 Secrets in the Shadows (2007)
 Shadows on the Soul (2007)
 Hungers of the Heart (2008)

Morgan Kingsley

Faeriewalker

Nikki Glass

Nightstruck 
 Nightstruck (2016)
Night Magic (2017)

Gifted 

 The Gifted Dead (2014)
 Schism (2015)

As Jenna Glass

The Women's War

Anthologies and collections

References

External links
 Jenna Black Official Website

21st-century American novelists
American romantic fiction writers
American women novelists
Duke University alumni
Living people
Novelists from North Carolina
21st-century American women writers
Urban fantasy writers
American paranormal romance writers
Year of birth missing (living people)
21st-century pseudonymous writers
Pseudonymous women writers